Robert Squire Reinelt (born 11 March 1974) is an English former professional footballer. He played for Aldershot, Gillingham, Colchester United, Brighton & Hove Albion, Leyton Orient and Stevenage Borough. between 1990 and 1999.

Reinelt is best remembered for his goal that preserved Brighton's Football League status, against Hereford United in 1997.

References

1974 births
Living people
People from Loughton
English footballers
Association football forwards
Aldershot F.C. players
Wivenhoe Town F.C. players
Gillingham F.C. players
Colchester United F.C. players
Brighton & Hove Albion F.C. players
Leyton Orient F.C. players
Stevenage F.C. players
St Albans City F.C. players
Braintree Town F.C. players
Redbridge F.C. players
English Football League players